Cambridge University Library, Ff. i.27 is a composite manuscript at the University of Cambridge. It was formed by adding a 14th-century Bury St Edmunds book to a compendium of material from 12th-century northern England (items 1 to 11 in #Contents). The latter compendium had once been part of Corpus Christi College Cambridge MS 66. With its original content, it had at one time been at Sawley Abbey, though it was probably produced somewhere else, perhaps Durham. It is a source for the Durham poem, which describes the city and its relics.

Ff. 1.27 as a whole came together in the 15th century or later, but pages 1 to 236 are earlier and paleographic evidence suggests that, with the exception of a continuation of Gildas' De excidio Britanniae dating to the 14th century, the material therein shares the same origin. Ff. i 27 and Corpus Christi 66 manuscripts probably had a common origin with Corpus Christi College Cambridge MS. 139 ("CCCC 139") as well, part of Ff. 1.27 being written in the same hand as part of 139's version of the Historia Regum.

Contents

Pages 253 to 471 are occupied by later material including, among other works, Gerald of Wales's De Descriptione Hybernie, his Expugnatio Hibernica, Vita Sancti Patricii Episcopi, with most of the rest afterward being material relating to Wales.

Notes

References

External links
 CCCC MS 66A (parkerweb.stanford.edu)

12th-century manuscripts
English chronicles
Manuscripts in Cambridge